There are many professional sports teams based in California, participating in sports such as baseball, American football, soccer, basketball, ice hockey, lacrosse, and ultimate.

Major professional sports teams

National Hockey League

Anaheim Ducks
based in Anaheim (Main article)
Expansion team in 1993
Previously known as the Mighty Ducks of Anaheim (1993–2006)
Currently play at Honda Center (1993–present)
No previous arenas (Honda Center was formerly known as Arrowhead Pond of Anaheim)
Stanley Cup Championships: 2007

Los Angeles Kings
based in Los Angeles (Main article)
Expansion team in 1967
No previous monikers
Currently play at Crypto.com Arena (1999–present)
Previously played at Long Beach Arena (1967), Los Angeles Memorial Sports Arena (1967), The Forum (1967–1999)
Stanley Cup Championships: 2012, 2014

San Jose Sharks 
based in San Jose (Main article)
Expansion team in 1991
No previous monikers
Currently play at SAP Center at San Jose (1993–present)
Previously played at Cow Palace (1991–1993)
Stanley Cup Championships: None

Major League Baseball

Los Angeles Angels
based in Anaheim  (Main article)
Expansion team in 1961
Previously known as the Los Angeles Angels (1961–1965), California Angels (1965–1996), Anaheim Angels (1997–2004), and Los Angeles Angels of Anaheim (2005–2015)
Currently play at Angel Stadium of Anaheim (1966–present)
Previously played at Wrigley Field (1961) and Dodger Stadium (1961–1965)
World Series Championships: 2002

Los Angeles Dodgers
based in Los Angeles (Main article)
Relocated from Brooklyn in 1958
Previously known as the Brooklyn Dodgers (1932–1957) and others (1883–1931)
Currently play at Dodger Stadium (1962–present)
Previously played at Ebbets Field (1913–1957), Los Angeles Memorial Coliseum (1958–1961), and others (1883–1912)
World Series Championships: 1959, 1963, 1965, 1981, 1988, 2020

Oakland Athletics
based in Oakland (Main article)
Relocated from Kansas City in 1968
Previously known as the Philadelphia Athletics (1901–1954) and Kansas City Athletics (1955–1967)
Currently play at the RingCentral Coliseum (1968–present)
Previously played at Columbia Park (1901–1908), Shibe Park (1909–1954), and Municipal Stadium (1955–1967)
World Series Championships: 1972, 1973, 1974, 1989

San Diego Padres
based in San Diego (Main article)
Expansion team in 1969
No previous monikers
Currently play at Petco Park (2004–present)
Previously played at San Diego Stadium (1969–2003)
World Series Championships: None

San Francisco Giants
based in San Francisco (Main article)
Relocated from New York City in 1958
Previously known as the New York Gothams (1883–1885) and New York Giants (1885–1958)
Currently play at Oracle Park (2000–present)
Previously played at the New York Polo Grounds (1911–1957), Seals Stadium (1958–1959), Candlestick Park (1960–1999), and others (1883–1910)
World Series Championships: 2010, 2012, 2014

National Football League

Los Angeles Chargers
play in Inglewood; headquarters in Costa Mesa (Main article)
Expansion team in 1960, played in San Diego from 1961 to 2016
Previously known as the San Diego Chargers (1961–2016)
Currently play at SoFi Stadium (2020–present)
Previously played at Los Angeles Memorial Coliseum (1960), Balboa Stadium (1961–1966), San Diego Stadium (1967–2016), and Dignity Health Sports Park (2017–2019)
Championships: 1963

Los Angeles Rams
play in Inglewood; headquarters in Agoura Hills (Main article)
Expansion team in 1936, played in Cleveland from 1936 to 1945 and St. Louis from 1995 to 2015
Previously known as the Cleveland Rams (1936–1945) and St. Louis Rams (1995–2015)
Currently play at SoFi Stadium (2020–present)
Previously played at Cleveland Stadium (1936–1937, 1939–1941), League Park (1937, 1942, 1944–1945), Shaw Stadium (1938), Los Angeles Memorial Coliseum (1946–1979, 2016–2019), Anaheim Stadium (1980–1994), Busch Memorial Stadium (1995), and Edward Jones Dome (1995–2015)
Championships: 1951, 2021 (LVI)

San Francisco 49ers
based in Santa Clara (stadium and HQ) (Main article)
Expansion team in 1946 (AAFC), joined NFL in 1950
No previous moniker
Currently play at Levi's Stadium (2014–present)
Previously played at Kezar Stadium (1946–1970) and Candlestick Park (1971–2013)
Championships: 1981 (XVI), 1984 (XIX), 1988 (XXIII), 1989 (XXIV), 1994 (XXIX)

National Basketball Association

Golden State Warriors
based in San Francisco (Main article)
Relocated from Philadelphia in 1962
Previously known as the Philadelphia Warriors (1946–1962) and San Francisco Warriors (1962–1971)
Currently play at Chase Center (2019–present).
Previously played at Cow Palace (1962–64, 1966–71), San Francisco Civic Auditorium (1964–67), USF War Memorial Gymnasium (1964–66), HP Pavilion at San Jose (1996–1997), Oracle Arena (1966–1967, 1971–1996 and 1997–2019), and others (1946–1962)
NBA Championships: 1975, 2015, 2017, 2018, 2022

Los Angeles Clippers
based in Los Angeles (Main article)
Relocated from Buffalo in 1978, relocated to Los Angeles in 1984
Previously known as the Buffalo Braves (1970–1978) and San Diego Clippers (1978–1984)
Currently play at Crypto.com Arena (1999–present)
Planning move to the Intuit Dome in 2024
Previously played at Buffalo Memorial Auditorium (1970–1978), San Diego Sports Arena (1978–1984), Los Angeles Memorial Sports Arena (1984–1999), and Arrowhead Pond (1994–1999)
NBA Championships: None

Los Angeles Lakers
based in Los Angeles (Main article)
Relocated from Minnesota in 1960
Previously known as the Detroit Gems (1946–1947) and Minneapolis Lakers (1947–1960)
Currently play at Crypto.com Arena (1999–present)
Previously played at Minneapolis Auditorium (1947–1960), Los Angeles Memorial Sports Arena (1960–1967), The Forum (1967–1999)
NBA Championships: 1972, 1980, 1982, 1985, 1987, 1988, 2000, 2001, 2002, 2009, 2010, 2020

Sacramento Kings
based in Sacramento (Main article)
Relocated from Kansas City in 1985
Previously known as the Rochester Royals (1945–1957), Cincinnati Royals(1957–1972), Kansas City-Omaha Kings (1972–1975), Kansas City Kings (1975–1985)
Currently play at the Golden 1 Center (2016–present)
Previously played at Kansas City Municipal Auditorium (1972–1974) Omaha Civic Auditorium (1972–1978), Kemper Arena (1974–1985), ARCO Arena I (1985–1988), Sleep Train Arena (1988–2016; also known as ARCO Arena and Power Balance Pavilion) (and others) (1945–1972)
NBA Championships: None

Major League Soccer

LA Galaxy
based in Carson (Main article)
Original team in league's 1996 inaugural season
No previous monikers
Currently play at Dignity Health Sports Park (2003–present)
Previously played at Rose Bowl (1996–2002)
Championships: MLS Cup (2002, 2005, 2011, 2012, 2014) Supporters' Shield (1998, 2002, 2010, 2011), Lamar Hunt U.S. Open Cup (2001, 2005), CONCACAF Champions Cup (2000)

Los Angeles FC
based in Los Angeles (Main article)
Expansion team in 2018
No previous monikers
Currently play at BMO Stadium (2018–present)
No previous stadiums
Championships: MLS Cup (2022); Supporters' Shield (2019, 2022)

San Jose Earthquakes
based in San Jose (Main article)
Original team in league's 1996 inaugural season
Previously known as the San Jose Clash (1996–1999)
Franchise on hiatus in the 2006 and 2007 seasons; the original ownership relocated the team to Houston after the 2005 season as the Houston Dynamo, but MLS kept the name and history of the original franchise in San Jose for a new ownership group
Currently play at PayPal Park (2015–present), plus other venues for select games
Previously played at Spartan Stadium (1996–2005), Buck Shaw Stadium (2008–2014), and other venues for select games
Championships: MLS Cup (2001, 2003), Supporters' Shield (2005, 2012)

Major women's professional sports teams

Women's National Basketball Association

Los Angeles Sparks
based in Los Angeles (Main article)
Inaugural WNBA team in 1997
No previous monikers
Currently play at Crypto.com Arena (1999–present)
Previously played at The Forum (1997–1998)
Championships: 2001, 2002, 2016

National Women's Soccer League

Angel City FC
based in Los Angeles (Main article)
Expansion team in 2022
No previous monikers
Currently play at BMO Stadium (2022–present), plus Titan Stadium (2022–present) for NWSL Challenge Cup home matches
No previous stadiums
Championships: None

San Diego Wave FC
based in San Diego (Main article)
Expansion team in 2022
No previous monikers
Currently play at Snapdragon Stadium (2022–present)
Previously played at Torero Stadium (2022 – first 9 home games)
Championships: None

Other professional sports teams

See also
 Sports in California

References

California

California sports-related lists